The Kingdom of Hanover was established in October 1814 by the Congress of Vienna, with the restoration of George III to his Hanoverian territories after the Napoleonic era. It succeeded the former Electorate of Hanover (known formally as the Electorate of Brunswick-Lüneburg), and joined 38 other sovereign states in the German Confederation in June 1815. The kingdom was ruled by the House of Hanover, a cadet branch of the House of Welf, in personal union with Great Britain since 1714. Since its monarch resided in London, a viceroy, usually a younger member of the British royal family, handled the administration of the Kingdom of Hanover.

The personal union with the United Kingdom ended in 1837 upon the accession of Queen Victoria because semi-Salic law prevented females from inheriting the Hanoverian throne while a dynastic male was still alive. Her uncle Ernest Augustus thus became the ruler of Hanover. His only son succeeded him to the throne as George V. However, as he backed the losing side in the Austro-Prussian War, his kingdom was conquered by Prussia in 1866 and ceased to exist as an independent kingdom, becoming a Prussian province. Along with the rest of Prussia, Hanover became part of the German Empire upon the unification of Germany in January 1871. Briefly revived as the State of Hanover in 1946, the state was later merged with some smaller states to form the current state of Lower Saxony in then West Germany.

History

The territory of Hanover had earlier been a principality within the Holy Roman Empire before being elevated into an electorate in 1708, when Hanover was formed by union of the dynastic divisions of the Duchy of Brunswick-Lüneburg, excepting the Principality of Brunswick-Wolfenbüttel.

After his accession in 1714, George Louis of the House of Hanover ascended the throne of Great Britain as George I, and Hanover was joined in a personal union with Great Britain. In 1803, Hanover was conquered by the French and Prussian armies in the Napoleonic Wars. The Treaties of Tilsit in 1807 joined it to territories from Prussia and created the Kingdom of Westphalia, ruled by Napoleon's youngest brother Jérôme Bonaparte. French control lasted until October 1813 when the territory was overrun by Russian Cossacks. The Battle of Leipzig shortly thereafter spelled the definitive end of the Napoleonic client states, and the electorate was restored to the House of Hanover.

The terms of the Congress of Vienna in 1814 not only restored Hanover, but elevated it to an independent kingdom with its Prince-Elector, George III of the United Kingdom, as King of Hanover. The new kingdom was also greatly expanded, becoming the fourth-largest state in the German Confederation (behind Prussia, Austria and Bavaria) and the second-largest in north Germany.

George III never visited the Kingdom during his 60-year reign. Having succumbed to dementia prior to the elevation of Hanover, it is unlikely he ever understood that he had gained an additional kingship nor did he take any role in its governance. Functional administration of Hanover was usually handled by a viceroy, which during the later years of George III's reign and the reigns of kings George IV and William IV from 1816 to 1837, was Adolph Frederick, George III's youngest surviving son. When Queen Victoria succeeded to the British throne in 1837, the 123-year personal union of Great Britain and Hanover ended. Unlike in Britain, Semi-Salic law operated in Hanover, which excluded the accession to the throne by a female while any male of the dynasty survived. 

Ernest Augustus, now the eldest surviving son of George III, succeeded to the throne as King of Hanover; Adolph Frederick the younger brother, and long-time Viceroy, returned to Britain. Ernest Augustus had a personally strained relationship with his niece Queen Victoria, they frequently squabbled over family affairs. Domestically, his reign began with a constitutional crisis as he tried to suspend parliament and nullify the written Constitution of 1819. He also presided over the country during the turbulent Revolutions of 1848.

His son, George V, assumed the throne in 1851. During the Austro-Prussian War (1866), Hanover attempted to maintain a neutral position, along with some other member states of the German Confederation. Hanover's vote in favor of the mobilisation of Confederation troops against Prussia on 14 June 1866 prompted Prussia to declare war. The outcome of the war led to the dissolution of Hanover as an independent kingdom and it was annexed by the Kingdom of Prussia, becoming the Prussian Province of Hanover. Along with the rest of Prussia, it became part of the German Empire in 1871.

After George V fled Hanover in 1866, he raised forces loyal to him in the Netherlands, called the Guelphic Legion. They were eventually disbanded in 1870. Nevertheless, George refused to accept the Prussian takeover of his realm and claimed he was still the legitimate king of Hanover. His only son, Ernest Augustus, Crown Prince of Hanover, inherited this claim upon George's death in 1878. Ernest Augustus was also first in line to the throne of the Duchy of Brunswick, whose rulers had been a junior branch of the House of Hanover. In 1884, that branch became extinct with the death of William, a distant cousin of Ernest Augustus. However, since Ernest Augustus refused to renounce his claim to annexed Hanover, the Bundesrat of the German Empire ruled that he would disturb the peace of the empire if he ascended the throne of Brunswick. As a result, Brunswick was ruled by a regency until 1913, when his son, also named Ernest Augustus, married the German Emperor's daughter, Princess Viktoria Luise and swore allegiance to the German Empire. The Duke then renounced his claim to Brunswick in favor of his son, and the Bundesrat allowed the younger Ernest Augustus to take possession of Brunswick as a kind of dowry compensation for Hanover.

The German-Hanoverian Party, which at times supported secession from the Reich, demanded a separate status for the province in the Reichstag. The party existed until banned by the Nazi government.

Revival and modern history
The state saw itself in the tradition of the kingdom. Its Prime Minister, Hinrich Wilhelm Kopf, played a central role when the state of Lower Saxony was founded just a few months later by merging Hanover with several smaller states, with the city of Hanover as its capital. The former territory of Hanover makes up 85 percent of Lower Saxony's territory,{ and the coat of arms is derived from it.

Reorganisation of religious bodies

The Lutheran church was the state church of the Kingdom of Hanover with the King being  (Supreme Governor of the Lutheran Church). Regional consistories supervised church and clergy. A general superintendent chaired each consistory.

In 1848, the Lutheran parishes were democratised by the introduction of presbyteries (singular ; literally: church boards), elected by all major male parishioners and chairing each congregation in co-operation with the pastor, being before the sole chairman. This introduction of presbyteries was somewhat revolutionary in the rather hierarchically structured Lutheran church. In 1864, Carl Lichtenberg, Hanoverian minister of education, cultural and religious affairs (1862–65), persuaded the Ständeversammlung (lit. Estates Assembly, the Hanoverian parliament) to pass a new law as to the constitution of the Lutheran church. The constitution provided a state synod (parishioners' parliament). But its first session only materialised in 1869 when, after the 1866 Prussian annexation of the Kingdom of Hanover, the Hanoverian Lutherans desired a representative body separate from Prussian rule, though it was restricted to Lutheran matters only.

After the Prussian conquest in 1866, on 19 September 1866, the day before the official Prussian annexation took place and with the last , King George V of Hanover, in exile, the Kingdom's six consistories joined to form today's still-existing church body, the Lutheran State Church of Hanover.

While the Calvinist congregations in formerly-Prussian East Frisia had a common roof organisation with the Lutherans there ("Coetus") and the Reformed Church in the former County of Bentheim, then being the state church, had fully established church bodies for Bentheim only, the Calvinist congregations elsewhere in Hanover were in a somewhat sorry state. Though some Calvinist congregations of Huguenot origin were organised in the Lower Saxon Confederation. The Lutheran church being the state church of Hanover also supervised the Calvinist diaspora parishes outside East Frisia and Bentheim. In 1848 the new Hanoverian law also provided for presbyteries in these Calvinist parishes, which exactly fit the presbyterian structure of Calvinism.

Catholics formed an overall minority in Hanover, but regionally majorities in the former prince-bishoprics. By the annexations in 1803 and 1814 Hanover had become a state of three Christian denominations. In 1824 Hanover and the Holy See thus agreed to integrate diaspora parishes which were located in prevailingly Protestant areas, until then supervised by the Roman Catholic Vicariate Apostolic of the Nordic Missions, into the existing dioceses of the former prince-bishoprics, whose diocesan territories were thus extended into the diaspora areas.

Jews lived all over Hanover in diaspora. Until 1806, they were not allowed to reside in some areas. By the Westphalian and French annexations in 1807 and 1810 all-male inhabitants in later restituted Hanover became Westphalian or French citizens of equal rights, though on 17 March 1808 Napoléon Bonaparte restricted the rights of Jews in the French-annexed territory by his so-called . When Hanover resumed independence and sovereignty in 1813 its government deprived the Jews their legal equality. Arguing it was the French or Westphalian state and not Hanover, which had emancipated the Jews, the government took the decisions of the German Confederation on the rights of the Jews, in Johann Smidt's manipulated formulation, as the legal grounds.

In 1842, Hanover finally granted equal rights to Jews and promoted to build up Jewish congregations, where this did not already happen earlier, and a superstructure of four regional land-rabbinates.

In many diaspora areas Jews regarded this a progress and a burden alike, because of the implied financial burden for rabbis and religion teacher, synagogues or schools. The local authorities now requested that the Jewish congregations establish synagogues and Jewish education for the pupils. The land-rabbins, chairing the land-rabbinates, simultaneously fulfilled religious and state functions, like supervising Jewish elementary schools and the teaching of Jewish religion in all schools. The Kingdom of Hanover was thus one of the few states within the German Confederation, where rabbins held a similar semi-state authoritative position as to Jews as did, e.g., Lutheran clergy towards Lutherans.

Kings

In 1813, George III was restored to his Hanoverian territories, and in October 1814 they were constituted as the independent Kingdom of Hanover at the Congress of Vienna. The personal union with the United Kingdom ended in 1837 on the accession of Queen Victoria because the succession laws in Hanover, based on Salic law, prevented a female inheriting the title if there was any surviving male heir (in the United Kingdom, a male took precedence only over his own sisters). In the Austro-Prussian War of 1866, Hanover was annexed by Prussia and became the Province of Hanover.

Pretenders
 George V (20 September 1866 – 12 June 1878)
 Ernest Augustus (12 June 1878 – 14 November 1923)
 Ernest Augustus (14 November 1923 – 30 January 1953)
 Ernest Augustus (30 January 1953 – 9 December 1987)
 Ernest Augustus (9 December 1987 – present)

Territory and administrative subdivisions

The Congress of Vienna instituted a territorial adjustment between Hanover and Prussia to form more contiguous borders. Hanover increased its area substantially, gaining the Prince-Bishopric of Hildesheim, East Frisia, the Lower County of Lingen and the northern part of the Prince-Bishopric of Münster. Hanover also annexed territories that had previously been ruled in personal union by its Elector, such as the Duchies of Bremen-Verden and the County of Bentheim. It lost those parts of Saxe-Lauenburg to the northeast of the Elbe, which was assigned in personal union to Denmark, except the Amt Neuhaus. Further small exclaves in the east were lost.

Hanover thus comprised a number of territories, which had been Imperial Estates within the Holy Roman Empire. Their respective governments, now called provincial governments, were organised according to partially very old traditions, including different levels of estate participation in rule. In 1823, the kingdom was reorganised into high-bailiwicks, each led by a high-bailiff according to unitary standards, thus doing away with the inherited provincial peculiarities.

The high-bailiwicks were subdivided into bailiwicks (singular ), presided by a bailiff (Amtmann, plural Amtleute). The high-bailiwicks, named after their capitals, were the following:

 Aurich, comprising former East Frisia
 Hanover, comprising about the former Principality of Calenberg in the Duchy of Brunswick-Lüneburg
 Hildesheim, comprising the former Brunswick-Lüneburg Principality of Grubenhagen and the former Prince-Bishopric of Hildesheim
 Lüneburg, comprising the former Brunswick-Lüneburg Principality of Lüneburg and the remainder of Saxe-Lauenburg areas
 Osnabrück, comprising the former County of Bentheim, the former Lower County of Lingen, and the former Prince-Bishopric of Osnabrück
 Stade, comprising the former Duchies of Bremen-Verden

The Hanoverian subdivisions into high-bailiwicks and bailiwicks remained unchanged until 1 April 1885, when they were replaced by Prussian-style provinces and districts (Kreise).

Image gallery

Army
The Kingdom of Hanover maintained an army after the Napoleonic Wars. In 1832, King William IV of Hanover and the United Kingdom issued his troops with British Army uniforms, but they differed slightly from their original British versions. When the personal union with the United Kingdom ended in 1837 and Ernst August ascended to the crown of Hanover, he replaced their uniforms with Prussian Army-style ones, which included the pickelhaube spiked helmet for his Guard Corps. By 1866 they wore a more Austrian style of uniform, with only the guard corps keeping the Prussian one. During the Austro-Prussian War, the Hanoverian Army fought and defeated the Prussians during its march south towards Austria, at the Battle of Langensalza. However, it was later surrounded and forced to surrender to Prussia.

Standard, ensign and coat of arms
After the personal union with the United Kingdom ended in 1837 with the accession of Queen Victoria, Hanover kept the British royal arms and standard, only introducing a new Crown (after the British model). The centre of this coat of arms and royal standard included the original arms of Hanover, which consisted of the two lions of the Brunswick, the rampant lion with hearts of Lüneburg and the horse of Hanover itself, surmounted by the Imperial Crown of the Holy Roman Empire for the Holy Roman office of Archbannerbearer/Archtreasurer). As Hanover no longer was ruled by the British monarchs, the arms of Hanover was simultaneously removed from the British coat of arms and royal standard, so it was no longer identical with that of the Kingdom of Hanover.

See also
 Guelphic Legion
 King's German Legion
 Kleindeutsche Lösung
 State of Hanover

Notes

 
1814 establishments in Europe
1866 disestablishments in Europe
States and territories established in 1814
Former monarchies of Europe
Germany–United Kingdom relations
Hanover